USS Harry Lee (APA-10) was a Harry Lee-class attack transport that saw service with the US Navy during World War II. She served in the Pacific War, as well as in North Atlantic Ocean operations, and safely returned home post-war with seven battle stars to her credit. She was the only ship in her class.

Harry Lee was built as the passenger ship SS Exochorda by New York Shipbuilding Co., Camden, New Jersey, in 1931 and operated in the Mediterranean area for American Export Lines. Acquired by the Navy 30 October 1940, she was converted at Tietjen and Lang Dry Dock Co., Hoboken, New Jersey, and commissioned Harry Lee (AP-17) 27 December 1940. Harry Lee was redesignated APA-10, 1 February 1943.

Pre-World War II North Atlantic operations 
Harry Lee spent the first few months of her commissioned service transporting U.S. Marine combat units to the Caribbean for training exercises, helping to build the amphibious teams which were to find such great success in the later stages of World War II. After a stay at Norfolk, Virginia, the transport was assigned in July to the Iceland route, carrying troops and supplies to that country from Norfolk and New York.

World War II operations 
After making two such passages, she returned to Boston, Massachusetts, 22 December 1941 to take part in additional training exercises. With America then in the war, Harry Lee spent the next 18 months in amphibious maneuvers in the Caribbean area. During this time the ship carried out many valuable experiments with landing craft and boat control procedures, all of which bore fruit in the dangerous months to come.

Supporting the North Africa invasion 
Returning to Boston 6 April 1943, Harry Lee was designated for use in the upcoming offensive in the Mediterranean, and sailed 8 June for Algeria. She anchored at Oran 22 June to prepare for the landing and found herself off the southwest coast of Sicily 10 July with Vice Admiral Hewitt's Western Naval Task Force. During this giant invasion Harry Lee debarked her troops through the heavy surf at Scoglitti and withstood several Axis air attacks before retiring 2 days later.

Transferred to the Pacific Fleet 
After the success of the Sicilian operation, the transport returned German prisoners of war to the United States, arriving Norfolk 3 August. It was then decided that her amphibious prowess was needed in the Pacific, and she sailed 24 August for Wellington, New Zealand, via the Panama Canal and San Francisco, California, arriving 12 October 1943. At Wellington Harry Lee loaded Marines in preparation for the big push of the invasion of the Gilbert Islands.

The invasion of Tarawa 
She proceeded to Efate, New Hebrides, 1 – 7 November and for the next few weeks held amphibious practice landings in preparation for the landings on Tarawa. The transport departed for Tarawa 13 November, and arrived offshore 20 November. There she launched her Marines onto the bloody beaches, under threat of submarine attack and air attack and sailed the next day for Pearl Harbor.

Invasion of the Marshall Islands 
Harry Lee participated in rehearsal landings in Hawaiian waters after her arrival at Pearl Harbor 7 December 1943, and sailed 23 January 1944 for the invasion of the Marshall Islands, next step on the island road to Japan. She arrived off Kwajalein 31 January. She effectively carried out her role in this complicated operation by landing troops on two small islands in the atoll; they met little opposition. Harry Lee remained off Kwajalein until departing for Funafuti 5 February. From there she sailed to Noumea 24 February and by 14 March was anchored off Guadalcanal to load troops and continue her amphibious preparations.

New Guinea operations 
After carrying troops to Bougainville and New Guinea in April, Harry Lee sailed to Aitape, New Guinea, under Rear Admiral Barbey for the Hollandia operation. She arrived 23 April after the initial assault, unloaded her troops, and proceeded to bring reinforcements from other points in New Guinea to the landing area. This accomplished, the transport arrived Espiritu Santo 11 May.

Landing troops on Guam 
Harry Lee was next to take part in the invasion of the Marianas. After landing operations conducted around Guadalcanal the ship sailed to Kwajalein and got underway in convoy for Guam 12 June. During this gigantic operation, in which troops were projected over 1,000 miles of ocean from the nearest advance base, Harry Lee was held in reserve for the Guam landings. She arrived off Agat, Guam, 21 July 1944 and debarked her troops. The transport then remained offshore loading and relanding troops for tactical purposes until 25 July, when she steamed with her fellow transports to Eniwetok. They arrived 29 July, and 2 days later sailed for Pearl Harbor.

Overhaul, and then to the Philippines 
Arriving Pearl Harbor 7 August 1944, Harry Lee set course for California and a much-needed overhaul. She arrived San Pedro, Los Angeles, 18 August and remained in California until departing 21 October with troops for Seeadler Harbor, Manus. Until 31 December the ship conducted practice landings in New Guinea and the Solomons for the upcoming invasion of Luzon, and departed the last day of 1944 for Lingayen Gulf.

En route, Japanese planes attacked the task force savagely with suicide planes and bombers, but Harry Lee by effective gunfire and luck escaped damage. She entered Lingayen Gulf 9 January 1945 and began landing troops under constant air alert. That night the transports retired off the beaches under smoke screens, returning next day to resume the dangerous job of landing supplies. Harry Lee sailed 10 January for Leyte Gulf, anchoring 14 January.

Iwo Jima, her last amphibious operation 
With troops ashore at Lingayen, Harry Lee departed 19 January for Ulithi and arrived 2 days later. She soon was back in action, however, sailing 17 February for Iwo Jima and her last amphibious operation of the war. The transport arrived via Guam 22 February, 3 days after the initial landings, and after sending a reconnaissance unit ashore 24 February disembarked her troops. The ship remained off Iwo Jima until 6 March acting as a hospital evacuation vessel. She then sailed with casualties to Saipan 6 – 9 March.
 
Harry Lee spent the rest of her time in the Pacific transporting troops and supplies, as the American thrust at Japan neared its final phase. She touched at Tulagi, Noumea, New Guinea, Manus, and the Philippines, bringing reinforcements and vitally needed supplies. The ship was at Leyte Gulf 20 July when ordered back to the United States, and she arrived for a brief stay 8 August. It was during this time that news of Japan's surrender reached the veteran transport.

End-of-war activity 
The ship reached Manila 16 September at aid in the occupation of Japan, and after loading troops at various points in the Philippines arrived Tokyo Bay 13 October 1945. Assigned to Operation Magic Carpet, and the huge job of bringing American veterans home from the Pacific, Harry Lee arrived San Francisco 4 November, and made another round trip to the Philippines and back, arriving 20 January 1946. From San Francisco she sailed 23 January for New York, via Norfolk.

Post-war decommissioning  
The ship arrived 9 February 1946 and decommissioned at Brooklyn Navy Yard 9 May 1946. After a period in Reserve Fleet, she was sold to Turkey in April 1948. Renamed Tarsus, she was burned in the Bosporus after a rare three-ship collision 14 December 1960.

Military awards and honors 
Harry Lee received seven battle stars for World War II service.

See also 
 Dwight Agnew, ship's commander during the Battle of Iwo Jima

References

Footnotes

External links 
 NavSource Online: Amphibious Photo Archive – AP-17 / APA-10 Harry Lee

Passenger ships of the United States
Ships built by New York Shipbuilding Corporation
1930 ships
Unique transports of the United States Navy
Attack transports of the United States Navy
World War II auxiliary ships of the United States